We All Know Who We Are is the second album by the funk band Cameo, released early in 1978.

Track listing
All tracks composed by Larry Blackmon; except where indicated
 "Inflation" – 4:40 
 "C On the Funk" – 4:25  
 "Why Have I Lost You" – 5:17  
 "Stand Up" – 3:34 (Blackmon, Eric Durham)
 "We All Know Who We Are" – 4:52 (Blackmon, Tomi Jenkins)
 "It's Serious" – 8:06 (Blackmon, Greg "Doc" Johnson)
 "It's Over" – 4:17 (Blackmon, Tomi Jenkins, Nathan Leftenant)

Personnel
Larry Blackmon - lead vocals, drums, percussion
 Gregory Johnson - keyboards, piano, vocals
Gary Dow - bass guitar
Eric Durham - guitar
Arnett Leftenant - saxophone, percussion
Nathan Leftenant - trumpet, percussion
Wayne Cooper - vocals, percussion
Tomi Jenkins - vocals
Charles Sampson - guitar

Charts

Singles

References

External links
 We All Know Who We Are at Discogs

Cameo (band) albums
1978 albums